The Virginia Governor's Cabinet is a body of the most senior appointed officers of the executive branch of the government of Virginia. The Cabinet is responsible for advising the Governor of Virginia. Cabinet officers are nominated by the Governor and then presented to the Virginia General Assembly for confirmation. Once confirmed, all members of the Cabinet receive the title "Secretary" and serve at the pleasure of the Governor.

The current Cabinet is serving under Governor of Virginia Glenn Youngkin.

In General

Appointment
Each Cabinet Secretary is appointed by the Governor of Virginia, subject to confirmation by the Virginia General Assembly if in session when the appointment is made. If the General Assembly is not in session, then the appointment is acted on by the General Assembly at its next succeeding session. Each Secretary is appointed for a four-year term but may be removed at any time by the Governor. Before discharging their duties, each Secretary must take an oath to faithfully execute the duties of their office.

Powers and duties
Each Cabinet Secretary is subject to direction and supervision by the Governor. All agencies assigned to each Secretary exercise their powers and duties in accordance with the general policy established by the Secretary acting on behalf of the Governor. Each Secretary has the power to resolve administrative, jurisdictional, operational, program, or policy conflicts between agencies or officials assigned to them, oversees and directs the formulation of program budgets for their assigned agencies, is responsible for holding their assigned agency heads accountable for their actions, and directs the development of goals, objectives, policies and plans for their assigned agencies.

Composition
The Governor's Cabinet is composed of the following officers, listed with the agencies they supervise:
Secretary of the Commonwealth
Secretary of Administration
Virginia Department of Human Resource Management
Virginia Department of General Services
Virginia Department of Employment Dispute Resolution
Secretary of Agriculture and Forestry
Virginia Department of Agriculture and Consumer Services
Virginia Department of Forestry
Secretary of Commerce and Trade
Board of Accountancy
Virginia Department of Business Assistance
Virginia Department of Housing and Community Development
Virginia Department of Labor and Industry
Virginia Department of Mines, Minerals and Energy
Virginia Department of Professional and Occupational Regulation
Secretary of Education
Virginia Department of Education
Secretary of Finance
Virginia Department of Accounts
Virginia Department of Planning and Budget
Virginia Department of Taxation
Virginia Department of the Treasury
Secretary of Health and Human Resources
Virginia Department for the Aging
Virginia Department for the Deaf and Hard of Hearing
Virginia Department of Health
Virginia Department of Health Professions
Virginia Department of Medical Assistance Services
Virginia Department of Behavioral Health and Developmental Services
Virginia Department for Aging and Rehabilitative Services
Virginia Department of Social Services
Virginia Department for the Blind and Vision Impaired
Secretary of Natural Resources
Virginia Department of Conservation and Recreation
Virginia Department of Environmental Quality
Virginia Department of Wildlife Resources
Virginia Department of Historic Resources
Virginia Marine Resources Commission
Secretary of Public Safety and Homeland Security
Virginia Alcoholic Beverage Control Authority
Virginia Department of Correctional Education
Virginia Department of Corrections
Virginia Department of Criminal Justice Services
Virginia Department of Emergency Management
Virginia Department of Fire Programs
Virginia Department of Forensic Science
Virginia Department of Juvenile Justice
Virginia Department of Military Affairs
Virginia Parole Board
Virginia State Police
 Secretary of Technology (merged into the Secretariat of Commerce and Trade)
Virginia Center for Innovative Technology
Virginia Information Technologies Agency
Secretary of Transportation
Virginia Department of Aviation
Virginia Department of Motor Vehicles
Virginia Department of Rail and Public Transportation
Virginia Department of Transportation
Virginia Port Authority
Commonwealth Transportation Board
Secretary of Veterans Affairs and Defense Affairs
Virginia Department of Veterans Services
Virginia War Memorial
Secure Commonwealth Panel

Current Cabinet Members
Currently, one Cabinet Secretary position is vacant. The current Cabinet, serving under Governor of Virginia Glenn Youngkin, is as follows:

Cabinet-level positions

See also
Government of Virginia
Cabinet of the United States

References

External links
Official website

 
Cabinet
United States state cabinets
Cabinet